Manuel Orantes defeated Wojtek Fibak in the final, 5–7, 6–2, 0–6, 7–6, 6–1 to win the singles title at the 1976 Commercial Union Assurance Masters.

Ilie Năstase was the defending champion, but did not participate this year.

Draw

Finals

Group A
 Standings are determined by: 1. number of wins; 2. number of matches; 3. in two-players-ties, head-to-head records; 4. in three-players-ties, percentage of sets won, or of games won; 5. steering-committee decision.

Group B
 Standings are determined by: 1. number of wins; 2. number of matches; 3. in two-players-ties, head-to-head records; 4. in three-players-ties, percentage of sets won, or of games won; 5. steering-committee decision.

See also
ATP World Tour Finals appearances

References
1976 Masters-Singles

Singles